The X Factor is a British television music competition to find new singing talent. The second series ran from 20 August to 17 December 2005. Shayne Ward became the winner and Louis Walsh emerged as the winning mentor. The second series was longer than the first, with seven acts in each of the three categories going to the judges' homes, and 12 acts in the finals instead of 9. Kate Thornton returned as presenter of the main show on ITV and Ben Shepherd presented the spin-off show The Xtra Factor on ITV2, while Simon Cowell, Sharon Osbourne and Walsh returned as judges. 75,000 people auditioned for the series.

On the back of their performances and popularity in the competition, Ward (winner), Andy Abraham (runner-up), Journey South (third place) and Maria Lawson (8th place) landed recording contracts. Chico Slimani (5th place) also released a single which topped the UK Singles Chart.

Aired on 24 September 2005, the mentoring selection was made, with Cowell in charge of Groups, Osbourne with the 25 and overs and Walsh managing the 16–24s. The bootcamp stages were shown on 1 October 2005, and those who got through were taken to the "judges' homes".

Judges, presenters and other personnel

Simon Cowell, Sharon Osbourne and Louis Walsh returned as judges, quashing rumours that Osbourne and Walsh might not return for financial reasons. Kate Thornton also returned as presenter of the main show on ITV and Ben Shephard returned as presenter of spin-off show The Xtra Factor on ITV2. Yvie Burnett joined the show as vocal coach.

Selection process
The auditions episodes were broadcast on 20 August 27 August 3 September 10 September 17 and 24 September 2005. The first two episodes of Bootcamp aired on 1 October 2005 and the last two the following week on 8 October 2005.

Bootcamp Tasks per Category

16-24s:

Location: artsdepot

Task 1 Songs:
 "Unchained Melody"
 "Careless Whisper" 
  "To Love Somebody"
 "From This Moment On"
  "Beautiful"

Task 2 Songs:
The 21 remaining contestants in the 16-24s category were divided into three groups of 7 with one song in each of the groups. Each contestant then performed their chosen song solo in front of Louis and his team. The songs were.

 "I'll Be There"
 "End of the Road"
 "Always on My Mind"

Groups:

Location: An Manor House within the 
Oxfordshire countryside.

Task 1: Perform both an uptempo and a slow song to show versatility.

Task 2: Learn one song of their choice within an hour and then perform it to Simon and his team.

Over 25s:

Location: Café de Paris

Task 1: Perform a song of their choice to Sharon and the rest of the contestants.

Task 2: Choose a song from an list of five and learn it overnight to perform for a place in Judges Houses. The songs performed during this round were:

 "Don't Let the Sun Go Down on Me"
 "I'm Gonna Make You Love Me"
 "Walk on By"
 "I Only Want to Be with You"
 Last song Not mentioned

Judges Houses Performances

 Contestant highlighted in bold advanced.

Over 25s:
 Maria: "Since U Been Gone"
 Richie: "One"
 Haifa: "(Your Love Keeps Lifting Me) Higher and Higher"
 Andy: "My Cherie Amour"
  Brenda: "I Just Want to Make Love to You"
 Joanne: "Right Here Waiting"
  Chico: "Livin' la Vida Loca"

Groups:
 The Brothers: "What Becomes of the Brokenhearted"
  4Tune: "I Don't Want to Talk About It"
 4th Base: "Your Song"
  The Conway Sisters: "You Raise Me Up"
 Eskimo Blonde: "Total Eclipse of the Heart"
  Journey South: "Desperado" 
 Addictiv Ladies: "Wishing on a Star"

16-24s
  Shayne: "The Air That I Breathe"
 James: "Lately"
 Alexandra: "Almaz"
  Chenai: "I'm Still Waiting"
  Phillip: "Don't Forget to Remember"
  Nicholas: "You Make Me Feel Brand New"
 Trevor: "This Is the Moment"

Acts 
Key:
 – Winner
 – Runner-up

Live shows
The live shows began on 15 October 2005, and the final was broadcast live on 17 December 2005.

Results summary
Colour key
 Act in team Simon

 Act in team Sharon

 Act in team Louis 

 For the only time in The X Factor history, a judge made an unforced decision to eliminate one of their own acts over another judge's act.
 Walsh was not required to vote as there was a majority.
 In Lawson's 2008 autobiography, Life Starts Now, she revealed she had topped the vote the week before her elimination.
 According to voting figures published in the Sunday Mirror, Lawson turned out to have received twice as many public votes as the Conway Sisters.
 Some of the voting results were also published in the same edition of the Sunday Mirror, the full voting results of the sixth week, Dorsett turned out to have topped the fifth week, Abraham topped the first, third and sixth weeks and Ward topped the second week.

Live show details

Week 1 (15 October)

 Best bits song: "That's What Friends Are For"

Judges' votes to eliminate
 Cowell: Chico Slimani – said that the judges had to pick the real talent over a "joke act", effectively backing his own act, Addictiv Ladies.
 Osbourne: Addictiv Ladies – backed her own act, Chico Slimani, whose performance she said was more exciting.
 Walsh: Addictiv Ladies – said that Slimani had the all-round entertainment package.

Week 2 (22 October)

 Best bits song: "You Are Not Alone"

Judges' votes to eliminate
 Cowell: Chenai Zinyuku – gave no reason, though effectively backed his own act, 4Tune.
 Walsh: 4Tune – gave no reason, though effectively backed his own act, Chenai Zinyuku.
 Osbourne: 4Tune – said that Zinyuku had a better chance of selling records.

Week 3 (29 October)

 Best bits song: "Amazed"

 

Judges' votes to eliminate
 Osbourne: Phillip Magee – gave no reason, though effectively backed her own act, Chico Slimani.
 Walsh: Chico Slimani – gave no reason, though effectively backed his own act, Phillip Magee.
 Cowell: Phillip Magee – said that he was gradually getting used to Slimani's "entertainment factor".

Week 4 (5 November)

 Best bits song: "Wishing on a Star"

Judges' votes to eliminate
 Osbourne: Nicholas Dorsett – said that Zinyku deserved her place in the competition more.
 Cowell: Chenai Zinyuku – said that Dorsett had not been in the bottom two previously and deserved a second chance.
 Walsh: Chenai Zinyuku – said that it was a tough decision to choose between his own acts.

Week 5 (12 November)

 Best bits song: "Didn't We Almost Have It All"

Judges' votes to eliminate
 Osbourne: The Conway Sisters – gave no reason, though effectively backed her own act, Maria Lawson.
 Cowell: Maria Lawson – gave no reason, though effectively backed his own act, The Conway Sisters.
 Walsh: Maria Lawson – went with his heart.

Walsh's decision to eliminate Lawson caused controversy when Osbourne accused Walsh of being part of the "Irish Mafia", since both he and The Conway Sisters are Irish. Cowell, though backed his own act to eliminate Lawson, said that if he had to go with his heart, he would have sent his own act home. He felt they would not have a chance to win, and that Lawson had more talent and her elimination would be the first one that the public would disagree with.

However, voting statistics revealed that Lawson received more votes than The Conway Sisters which meant that if the result went to deadlock, The Conway Sisters would have been eliminated.

Week 6 (19 November)

 Best bits song: "End of the Road"

Judges' votes to eliminate
 Walsh: The Conway Sisters – gave no reason, though effectively backed his own act, Nicholas Dorsett.
 Cowell: Nicholas Dorsett – backed his own act, The Conway Sisters.
 Osbourne: Nicholas Dorsett – gave no reason.

However, voting statistics revealed that Dorsett received more votes than The Conway Sisters which meant that if the result went to deadlock, The Conway Sisters would have been eliminated.

Week 7 (26 November)

 Best bits song: "You Raise Me Up"

Judges' votes to eliminate
 Osbourne: The Conway Sisters – gave no reason, though effectively backed her own act, Chico Slimani.
 Cowell: The Conway Sisters – said that both acts deserved to be in the bottom two, but felt Slimani had an entertainment value and voted to eliminate The Conway Sisters despite them being his own act. This became the first time ever in the history of the show that a mentor decided to eliminate his own act over the act from another category.
 Walsh was not required to vote as there was already a majority.

Week 8: Quarter-Final (3 December)

 Best bits song: "Hero"

The quarter-final did not feature a final showdown and instead the act with the fewest public votes, Chico Slimani, was automatically eliminated. After his elimination, Slimani reprised his performance of "Time Warp" as his exit song.

Week 9: Semi-Final (10 December)

 Best bits song: "Don't Let the Sun Go Down on Me"

The semi-final did not feature a final showdown and instead the act with the fewest public votes, Brenda Edwards, was automatically eliminated. After her elimination, Edwards reprised her performance of "Without You" as her exit song.

Week 10: Final (17 December)
Themes: No theme; Christmas songs; song of the series; winner's single
Musical guest: The X Factor rejex ("My Way")
 Finalists Best bits songs: "One", "Greatest Love of All" & "Your Song"

Reception

Ratings

Controversies

Elimination of Maria Lawson and "Irish Mafia"

After the final showdown in week 5, controversy was created around the judges' voting process when Walsh cast the deciding vote to keep The Conway Sisters, who are Irish, in the show at the expense of Maria Lawson. Osbourne later claimed that Lawson was the victim of the "Irish Mafia" after Walsh chose to keep The Conway Sisters in. When the voting statistics were revealed at the end of the series, Lawson was revealed to have received twice as many public votes as The Conway Sisters. Osbourne's "Irish Mafia" remark resulted in an investigation by media regulator Ofcom over Osbourne's "Irish Mafia" remark, however on 9 January 2006, Ofcom cleared Osbourne of any wrongdoing.

Louis Walsh

Rumours later circulated that Walsh had quit the show after being humiliated and "bullied" by Osbourne and Cowell. In addition to the media outrage at his choice to eliminate Lawson, there were verbal assaults. Furthermore, on 19 November, during the sixth live show of the series, Osbourne threw water over Walsh live on air after he asked her, "Are you on drugs? Are you taking Ozzy's drugs?" at the start of her (positive) critique of Journey South's performance of Robbie Williams' 1997 hit single "Angels". Cowell apparently "begged" Walsh to come back and, in the event, Walsh did turn up for the next show; it was stated that he had indeed quit midweek but had been persuaded to return. He explained how he had felt he could not take the pressure any more, and denied that the episode was a publicity stunt.

References

 02
2005 British television seasons
2005 in British television
2005 in British music
United Kingdom 02